Mount Pleasant is a British comedy-drama which first aired on Sky 1 on 24 August 2011. The show moved to Sky Living in 2012, before moving back to Sky 1 in 2015. The show ended in a 90 minute special on 30 June 2017.

Premise
Set in Manchester, the show is about the day-to-day life of the main character Lisa, her husband, her dad, as well as neighbours and colleagues. Each episode is an hour long (including adverts) and takes place in various locations, including the cul-de-sac Lisa lives in, her workplace, local pub The Dog and Dart, and more.

Cast and characters
 Sally Lindsay as Lisa Johnson
 Daniel Ryan as Dan Johnson
 Bobby Ball as Barry Harris
 Pauline Collins as Sue Harris (Series 1–2)
 Paula Wilcox as Pauline Johnson
 Adrian Bower as Greg Porter
 Angela Griffin as Shelley Porter (Series 1–2)
 Neil Fitzmaurice as Fergus Smythe
 Ainsley Howard as Denise Bradwell
 Sue Vincent as Margaret Harris
 Ted Robbins as Terry Harris
 Kris Sleater as Lloyd (Series 1)
 Jill Halfpenny as Emma (Series 1)
 Siân Reeves as Bianca (Series 1–4)
 Liza Tarbuck as Kate (Series 1–2)
 Owen McDonnell as Jack (Series 1–2)
 Diane Morgan as Talia (Series 1–2)
 Alexander Kirk as Jim (Series 1–2)
 Cordelia Bugeja (Series 1-2) as Jane, Jo Joyner recast as Jayne (Series 6)
 Claire Goose as Kim (Series 2)
 Robson Green as Chris (Series 2)
 David Bradley as Charlie Johnson (Series 2–4)
 George Sampson as Gary (Series 2–4)
 James Dreyfus as Roger Jones (Series 2-6)
 Sophia Di Martino as Amber (Series 3)
 Samantha Womack as Tanya Porter (Series 3-6)
 Nigel Harman as Bradley Dawson (Series 3-6)
 Nicola Millbank as Ella Dawson (Series 3-6)
 Daniel Ings as Robbie Johnson (Series 4)
 Nicola Hughes as Jenna Miller (Series 5-6)
 Patrick Robinson as Cameron Miller (Series 5-6)
 Ellen Thomas as Nana Miller (Series 5-6)
 Asan N'Jie as Finn Miller (Series 5-6)
 Zita Sattar as Amita (Series 5)
 Clive Mantle as Trevor (Series 5)
 Jordan Dawes as Ollie Oliver (Series 6)
 James Lance as Adam Wyatt (Series 6)
 Emily May Townsend as Emily (Series 6)
 Joey Batey as Gopher

Episodes

Production
The series is produced by Tiger Aspect Productions for Sky1. The series is filmed in Hale, Trafford, Chorlton, Manchester, and at The Sharp Project studio in Newton Heath, Manchester. The first series was filmed throughout June 2011. As of 2016, the show has aired six series.

Home media
The complete first series of Mount Pleasant was released on DVD on 3 September 2012.

The complete second series of Mount Pleasant was released on DVD on 21 October 2013.

References

External links
 
 
 

2011 British television series debuts
2017 British television series endings
British comedy television shows
English-language television shows
Sky UK original programming
Television series by Banijay
Television series by Tiger Aspect Productions